The 2018 Dayton Flyers football team represented the University of Dayton in the 2018 NCAA Division I FCS football season. They were led by 11th-year head coach Rick Chamberlin and played their home games at Welcome Stadium. They were a member of the Pioneer Football League. They finished the season 6–5, 5–3 in PFL play to finish in a tie for fourth place.

Previous season
The Flyers finished the 2017 season 5–6, 4–4 in PFL play to finish in a tie for sixth place.

Preseason

Award watch lists
Lott Trophy – Sr. S David Leisring

Preseason All-PFL team
The PFL released their preseason all-PFL team on July 30, 2018, with the Flyers having seven players selected.

Offense

Adam Trautman – TE

Tucker Yinger – RB

Ben Gauthier – OL

Defense

Nick Surges – DL

David Leisring – DB

Special teams

Sean Smith – P

Matt Tunnacliffe – LS

Preseason coaches poll
The PFL released their preseason coaches poll on July 31, 2018, with the Flyers predicted to finish in second place.

Schedule

Source: Schedule

Game summaries

Robert Morris

at Southeast Missouri State

at Duquesne

Davidson

at Marist

Valparaiso

at San Diego

Drake

at Butler

Morehead State

at Jacksonville

References

Dayton
Dayton Flyers football seasons
Dayton Flyers football